Anilton César Varela da Silva (born 25 February 1989), also known as Pany Varela, is a futsal player who plays for Sporting CP as a winger. Born in Cape Verde, he represents Portugal internationally.

In 2021, he scored in the 2 most important finals of the sport, in terms of clubs and national teams, respectively: 1 goal in the Champions League final against Barcelona and 2 goals (the only ones in the match) in the final of the World Cup against Argentina, thus, aiding both his teams' victories in the competition.

Club career
Born in Tarrafal, Cape Verde, Anilton moved to the ICeSa neighbourhood in Vialonga, Portugal in 1999 and started playing futsal for the local club Os Patuscos. 
 After three seasons at UDC Forte da Casa, he moved to the youth ranks of Benfica, staying just one year, earning a place in the main squad in 2008. Over the three years he spent at Benfica, he won three league titles, four other cups, and was part of the squad that won the 2009–10 UEFA Futsal Cup.

On 29 December 2011, Anilton was loaned out to gain experience, joining Belenenses on a six-month deal. He moved to Olivais on 19 August 2012, in an equal predicament, but for one season.

On 16 June 2013, Anilton moved to Fundão on a permanent deal, In the first year there, he helped the club win their first title ever, the Taça de Portugal de Futsal, plus reach the playoff finals. After three years with Fundão, Anilton returned to Lisbon to play for Sporting CP, joining them on 19 July 2016. He helped them reach two consecutive UEFA Futsal Cup finals in 2016–17 and 2017–18.

International career
Anilton made his debut for Portugal national team on 22 June 2015, and has represented them on the UEFA Futsal Euro 2016 and UEFA Futsal Euro 2018, winning the latter.

Honours

Benfica
 UEFA Futsal Cup: 2009–10
 Liga Portuguesa: 2008–09, 2011–12
 Taça de Portugal: 2008–09, 2011–12
 Supertaça de Portugal: 2010, 2012

Fundão
 Taça de Portugal: 2013–14

Sporting
 Liga Portuguesa: 2016–17, 2017–18, 2020–21, 2021-22
 Taça de Portugal: 2017–18, 2018–19, 2020–21, 2021-22
 Taça da Liga de Futsal: 2016–17, 2020–21, 2021–22
 Supertaça de Portugal: 2017, 2018, 2019, 2021
 Taça de Honra AF Lisboa: 2016, 2017
 UEFA Futsal Champions League: 2018-19, 2020–21

Portugal

 UEFA Futsal Championship: 2018, 2022
 FIFA Futsal World Cup: 2021
 Futsal Finalissima: 2022

Individual 

 FIFA Futsal World Cup Silver Ball 2021
 FIFA Futsal World Cup Silver Shoe 2021

References

External links

1989 births
Living people
People from Santiago, Cape Verde
Futsal forwards
Cape Verdean emigrants to Portugal
Naturalised citizens of Portugal
Portuguese men's futsal players
Cape Verdean men's futsal players
S.L. Benfica futsal players
C.F. Os Belenenses futsal players
Sporting CP futsal players
Portuguese people of Cape Verdean descent